Pytho may refer to:
 Delphi or Pytho, a sacred precinct that served as the seat of the oracle Pythia
 Pytho (beetle), a genus of dead-log beetles

See also
 Python (mythology)